Wade Stowell "Red" Woodworth (August 23, 1905 – June 29, 1992) was an American football player and coach.  He served as the head football coach at the University of Cincinnati for the final five games of the 1937 season.

Head coaching record

College

References

External links
 

1905 births
1992 deaths
American football guards
Cincinnati Bearcats football coaches
Northwestern Wildcats football players
High school football coaches in Illinois
All-American college football players
Sportspeople from Providence, Rhode Island
Players of American football from Providence, Rhode Island